Rush to Judgment: A Critique of the Warren Commission's Inquiry into the Murders of President John F. Kennedy, Officer J.D. Tippit and Lee Harvey Oswald is a 1966 book by American lawyer Mark Lane. It is about the assassination of United States President John F. Kennedy and takes issue with the investigatory methods and conclusions of the Warren Commission. The book's introduction is by Hugh Trevor-Roper, Regius Professor of History at the University of Oxford. Although it was preceded by a few self-published or small press books, Rush to Judgment was the first mass market hardcover book to confront the findings of the Warren Commission.

The title of the book was taken from Lord Chancellor Thomas Erskine's defense of James Hadfield, who had attempted to assassinate King George III in 1800. According to Alex Raskin of the Los Angeles Times, "Rush to Judgment opened the floodgate for [Kennedy assassination] conspiracy theories".

Contents

Rush to Judgment
Rush to Judgment became a number one best seller and spent 29 weeks on the New York Times best-seller list. Lane questions, among other things, the Warren Commission conclusion that three shots were fired from the Texas School Book Depository, and focuses on the witnesses who had recounted seeing or hearing shots coming from the grassy knoll in Dealey Plaza. Lane questions whether Oswald was guilty of the murder of policeman J.D. Tippit shortly after the Kennedy murder.  Lane also states that none of the Warren Commission firearm experts were able to duplicate Oswald's shooting feat.

According to former KGB officer Vasili Mitrokhin in his 1999 book The Sword and the Shield, the KGB helped finance Lane's research on Rush to Judgment without the author's knowledge. The KGB  allegedly used journalist Genrikh Borovik as a contact and provided Lane with $2000 for research and travel in 1964. Mark Lane called the allegation "an outright lie" and wrote, "Neither the KGB nor any person or organization associated with it ever made any contribution to my work."

Documentary

In 1967, a documentary film based on Lane's book was directed by Emile de Antonio and hosted by Lane. Some of the assassination witnesses who present their observations on-camera include Abraham Zapruder, James Tague, Charles Brehm, Mary Moorman, Jean Hill, Lee Bowers, Sam Holland, James Simmons, Richard Dodd, Jessie Price, Orville Nix, Patrick Dean, Napoleon Daniels, Nancy Hamilton, Joseph Johnson, Roy Jones, Acquilla Clemons, and Cecil McWatters.

See also
List of American films of 1967
John F. Kennedy assassination conspiracy theories

References

1966 non-fiction books
1967 films
American documentary films
Documentary films about the assassination of John F. Kennedy
Films directed by Emile de Antonio
Non-fiction books about the assassination of John F. Kennedy
The Bodley Head books
1960s American films